Calliostoma lithocolletum is a species of sea snail, a marine gastropod mollusk in the family Calliostomatidae.

Description
The height of the shell attains 18 mm.

Distribution
This species occurs in the Atlantic Ocean at bathyal depths off the Canary Islands; and off Senegal to Ghana

References

 Gofas, S.; Le Renard, J.; Bouchet, P. (2001). Mollusca, in: Costello, M.J. et al. (Ed.) (2001). European register of marine species: a check-list of the marine species in Europe and a bibliography of guides to their identification. Collection Patrimoines Naturels, 50: pp. 180–213

External links
 

lithocolletum
Gastropods described in 1925